Deborah Düring (born 18 July 1994) is a German politician of Alliance 90/The Greens who has been serving as a member of the Bundestag from the state of Hesse since 2021 elections.

Early life and career 
Born in Munich, Düring grew up in Wolnzach, Bavaria.

After graduating high school, Düring spent a voluntary social year working with indigenous communities in Costa Rica. She studied social science in Augsburg and spent a semester abroad in Lima, Peru. After completing her Bachelor's degree, including a dissertation on resource conflict, Düring began studying for a Master's degree in Peace and Conflict Research at Goethe University Frankfurt, TU Darmstadt and the Peace Research Institute Frankfurt.

From 2018 to 2020, Düring worked as a trainee at the state investment bank KfW in the field of development work.

Political career 
Early in her career, Düring held the position of speaker at the Green Youth in Augsburg. Since 2019, she has been speaker for the Green Youth in Hesse.

Since 2021, Düring has been a member of the Bundestag. In parliament, she has since been serving on the Committee on Economic Cooperation and Development and the Subcommittee on Global Health. She is also her parliamentary group’s spokesperson on development policy.

In addition to her committee assignments, Düring is part of the German Parliamentary Friendship Group for Relations with the States of Central America.

Other activities 
 GIZ, Member of the Board of Trustees (since 2022)

Personal life 
Düring lives in Frankfurt’s Bockenheim district. She is a vegetarian.

References

External links
 Official website (in German)

1994 births
21st-century German politicians
Alliance 90/The Greens politicians
Members of the Bundestag for Hesse
Living people
Female members of the Bundestag
21st-century German women politicians